Iliocostalis muscle is the muscle immediately lateral to the longissimus that is the nearest to the furrow that separates the epaxial muscles from the hypaxial. It lies very deep to the fleshy portion of the serratus posterior muscle. It laterally flexes the vertebral column to the same side.

Structure
Iliocostalis muscle has a common origin from the iliac crest, the sacrum, the thoracolumbar fascia, and the spinous processes of the vertebrae from T11 to L5.

Iliocostalis cervicis (cervicalis ascendens) arises from the angles of the third, fourth, fifth, and sixth ribs, and is inserted into the posterior tubercles of the transverse processes of the fourth, fifth, and sixth cervical vertebrae.

Iliocostalis thoracis (musculus accessorius; iliocostalis thoracis) arises by flattened tendons from the upper borders of the angles of the lower six ribs medial to the tendons of insertion of the iliocostalis lumborum; these become muscular, and are inserted into the upper borders of the angles of the upper six ribs and into the back of the transverse process of the seventh cervical vertebra.

Iliocostalis lumborum (iliocostalis muscle; sacrolumbalis muscle) is inserted, by flattened tendons, into the inferior borders of the angles of the lower six to nineribs.

Nerve supply 
Iliocostalis muscle is supplied by the dorsal rami of spinal nerves.

Function 
Iliocostalis muscle laterally flexes the vertebral column to the same side. It bilaterally extends the vertebral column.

See also
 Erector spinae muscles
 Longissimus muscles
 Semispinalis muscles
 Spinalis muscle

References

External links
  – "Intrinsic muscles of the back."
 Dissection at ithaca.edu 

Muscles of the torso